Libart is a free software graphics library of functions for 2D graphics supporting a superset of the PostScript imaging model. Libart was designed to be integrated with graphics, artwork, and illustration programs. It is written in optimized C and is fully compatible with C++. With a small footprint of 10,000 lines of code, it is especially suitable for embedded applications.

Libart provides a vector graphics-based API. Cairo obsoletes almost all uses of libart.

Libart supports a very powerful imaging model, basically the same as SVG and the Java 2D API. It includes all PostScript imaging operations, and adds antialiasing and alpha-transparency.

History 
Libart was a library for high-performance 2D graphics. Prior to being replaced with Cairo, it had been used as the anti-aliased rendering engine for the Gnome Canvas and for Gill, the Gnome Illustration app.

Gdk-pixbuf used to be a wrapper around libart.

A LGPL'd component of libart was also written, containing all functions needed for running the Gnome Canvas, and for printing support. The GPL'd contained various enhanced functions for specific applications.

Notable usage 
 Eye of GNOME depends on libart
 GNOME Canvas uses Libart as its rendering API.
 GIMP used Libart for vector rendering.
 Dia can use Libart for antialiasing and PNG export.

References

External links
 
 Gnome Illustration app (levien.com)
 The libart library – a tutorial (gnome.org)

Graphics libraries
X-based libraries
GNOME libraries
GTK